Klopper(s) is a Dutch surname. Notable people with the surname include:

 Hendrik Klopper (1902–1978), South African general
 Jacobus Kloppers (born 1937), Canadian organ composer and musicologist (South African descent)
 Junita Kloppers-Lourens, South African politician and educator
 Marius Kloppers (born 1962), South African businessman
 Stefan Klopper (born 1996), South African cricketer

Dutch-language surnames
Afrikaans-language surnames
Surnames of Dutch origin